Hector Cantú (born September 16, 1961) is an American writer, editor, and newspaper comic strip creator, best known for the Latino-American strip Baldo.

Biography

Early life and career
Cantú created his first cartoon at age 12 for a community newspaper in Crystal City, Texas, owned by his brother, inspired by Mad magazine cartoonists Sergio Aragonés and Antonio Prohías. He attended Skyline High School in Dallas, where he was editor of the school newspaper. He studied journalism at the University of Texas at Austin, where he was an assistant managing editor at The Daily Texan. He later worked as a reporter and editor at the San Antonio Light, the Dallas Times Herald, and The Dallas Morning News. He was managing editor of Hispanic Business magazine in Santa Barbara, California. He has written freelance for the Los Angeles Times Magazine, The Hollywood Reporter, and D Magazine. Cantú is among the 21 Latino comic book and comic strip authors and artists featured in comic historian Frederick Luis Aldama's 2009 book Your Brain on Latino Comics.

Baldo
In 1998, Cantú and artist Carlos Castellanos teamed to create the comic strip Baldo, about a 15-year-old Latino-American teenager, Baldomero Bermudez, nickname Baldo, living with his 8-year-old sister Gracie; their father, Sergio; and their aunt, Tia Carmen. Universal Press Syndicate (now Andrews McMeel Syndication) contracted for the strip, and in April 2000 it launched in newspapers, which number nearly 200 as of late 2008. It ranked among Universal Press Syndicate's 5 most successful launches.

Cantú in 2007 said he and Castellanos were prompted to create Baldo

Two Baldo compilation books, The Lower You Ride, The Cooler You Are and Night Of The Bilingual Telemarketers, have been published by Andrews McMeel Publishing, LLC.

The Spanish-language television network Univision optioned the strip for an animated television series.

Later career
As of 2007, Cantú is editor and publisher of The Intelligent Collector magazine at Heritage Auctions. He is co-editor of the book Collectible Movie Posters published by Whitman Publishing. He is founding chair of Texas Cartoonists, a regional chapter of the National Cartoonists Society.

Footnotes

External links
 “Labor of Laughter,” The (Eugene, OR) Register-Guard, March 31, 2018
 “For Comic Strip Authors In The Trump Era, 'No Art Should Live In A Vacuum’”, National Public Radio, January 21, 2018
Comics: Meet the Artist: "With Hector Cantu and Carlos Castellanos, Cartoonists — 'Baldo'", WashingtonPost.com Webchat, July 12, 2002
"'Baldo' Creators Draw Attention to National Literacy Day", Universal Press Syndicate press release, June 18, 2004
Hooten, Jeffery D. "'Baldo' writer addresses his work at Texas Union", The Daily Texan (University of Texas at Austin), September 12, 2007; updated January 9, 2009
Astor, Dave. "'Baldo' Strip Includes What 'The War' Series Mostly Omits", Editor & Publisher, September 24, 2007, via DefendTheHonor.org
Pounder, Lori. "Creating ‘Baldo’: Comic strip author Hector Cantú spoke at Summit Middle School Friday", Summit Daily News (Summit County, Colorado), January 18, 2008

American comics writers
Writers from Texas
1961 births
Living people
People from Weslaco, Texas